The 2013–14 San Diego State men's basketball team represented San Diego State University during the 2013–14 NCAA Division I men's basketball season. They were members in the Mountain West Conference. This was head coach Steve Fisher's fifteenth season at San Diego State. The Aztecs played their home games at Viejas Arena. They finished the season 31–5, 16–2 in Mountain West play to win the Mountain West regular season championship. They advanced to the finals of the Mountain West tournament where they lost to New Mexico. They received an at-large bid to the NCAA tournament where they defeated New Mexico State and North Dakota State to advance to the Sweet Sixteen where they lost to Arizona.

Previous season
San Diego State's 2012-13 team finished with a record of 23–11 overall, 9–7 in Mountain West play for 3rd place tie with Boise State. They lost in the semifinals in the 2013 Mountain West Conference men's basketball tournament to New Mexico. They received an at-large bid as a 7-seed in the 2013 NCAA Division I men's basketball tournament, in which they beat Oklahoma in the second round, and lost in the third round to Florida Gulf Coast.

Off-season

Departures

Incoming transfers

2013 recruiting class

Roster

Schedule

|-
!colspan=9 style="background:#C23038; color:#231F20;"| Exhibition

|-
!colspan=9 style="background:#C23038; color:#231F20;"| Regular season

|-
!colspan=9 style="background:#C23038; color:#231F20;"| Mountain West tournament

|-
!colspan=9 style="background:#C23038; color:#231F20;"| NCAA tournament

Rankings

*AP does not release post-NCAA Tournament rankings.

References

San Diego State
San Diego State Aztecs men's basketball seasons
San Diego State